Damian Alejandro Villa Valadez (born August 7, 1990 in Zamora, Michoacán) is a male Mexican taekwondo athlete. He is a double World Medalist at the World Taekwondo Championships, earning medals in 2009 and 2013. He is also a Silver Medalist at the 2011 Pan American Games, as well as a Silver and a Bronze Medalist at the 2010 and 2014 Central American Games, respectively.

External links
 Profile from The-Sports.org

1990 births
Living people
Mexican male taekwondo practitioners
People from Zamora, Michoacán
Sportspeople from Michoacán
Pan American Games silver medalists for Mexico
Taekwondo practitioners at the 2011 Pan American Games
Pan American Games medalists in taekwondo
Central American and Caribbean Games silver medalists for Mexico
Central American and Caribbean Games bronze medalists for Mexico
Competitors at the 2010 Central American and Caribbean Games
Competitors at the 2014 Central American and Caribbean Games
World Taekwondo Championships medalists
Central American and Caribbean Games medalists in taekwondo
Medalists at the 2011 Pan American Games
21st-century Mexican people